Muna Lee (born October 30, 1981 
in Little Rock, Arkansas) is an American sprinter. Lee ran track collegiately at Louisiana State University. Lee was a seven-time NCAA champion, 12-time SEC champion and 20-time All-American with the Lady Tigers from 2001-04.

Lee made her Olympics debut for the United States immediately following an exceptional senior season in 2004. In Athens, Greece, Lee qualified for her first career final in international competition as she took seventh place overall in the 200-meter dash. She had an impressive performance at the 2004 Olympic Trials, moving up in the final stretch while running in lane 1 to place second and win a spot on the Olympic Team. She went on to place 7th at the Olympic Games.

Lee won a gold medal as part of the women's 4 x 100m relay team at the 2005 World Championships in Athletics. Lee went on to place 7th at the 2005 World Championships in Athletics – Women's 100 metres

At the 2008 Summer Olympics in Beijing she competed at the 100 metres sprint. In her first round heat she placed first in front of Anita Pistone and Guzel Khubbieva in a time of 11.44 to advance to the second round. There she improved her time to 11.08 and to finish second after Sherone Simpson to qualify for the semifinals. With 11.06 she placed second behind Shelly-Ann Fraser to qualify for the final, in which she placed in fifth position with a time of 11.07 seconds.

She took second place at the US Championships (just one thousandth of a second behind in-form Carmelita Jeter) and qualified for the 2009 World Championships in Athletics.

A week before the World Championships, Lee was part of a United States 4 x 100 m relay team that ran the fastest women's sprint relay in twelve years. Lauryn Williams, Allyson Felix, Lee and Jeter finished with a time of 41.58 seconds, bringing them to eighth on the all-time list. Lee finished 5th in the Semifinals but failed to advance in the 2009 World Championships in Athletics – Women's 100 metres. Lee finished 4th in the final in 2009 World Championships in Athletics – Women's 200 metres.

Lee now works as an assistant coach at Hendrix College.

Personal bests
100 metres - 10.85 (2008) (USA Track and Field Championships) Position = 1st
100 metres - wind aided 10.78 (2009) (USA Track and Field Championships) Position = 2nd
200 metres - 22.01 (2008) (Olympic Finals)Position = 4th
200 metres - wind aided 21.91 (2009) (Guadeloupe) Position = 1st

References

External links
 
 
 
 
 
 

1981 births
Living people
Sportspeople from Little Rock, Arkansas
Track and field athletes from Arkansas
American female sprinters
Athletes (track and field) at the 2004 Summer Olympics
Athletes (track and field) at the 2008 Summer Olympics
Olympic track and field athletes of the United States
African-American female track and field athletes
World Athletics Championships athletes for the United States
World Athletics Championships medalists
LSU Lady Tigers track and field athletes
USA Outdoor Track and Field Championships winners
World Athletics Championships winners
Olympic female sprinters
21st-century African-American sportspeople
21st-century African-American women
20th-century African-American people
20th-century African-American women